The 1896 Clemson Tigers football team represented Clemson Agricultural College—now known as Clemson University–as an independent during the 1896 college football season. Professor Walter Riggs brought the game to Clemson from his alma mater, Auburn, where he was a member of Auburn's first football team. The Tigers completed their first season with a record of 2–1, with wins over upstate neighboring colleges Furman and Wofford, and a loss in the first installment of the rivalry with South Carolina. All games were played in the opposing school's home city. The rivalry matchup with South Carolina was held on Thursday morning at the South Carolina state fair, a tradition that would endure until 1960. Riggs served as the team's coach while R. G. Hamilton was the first captain.

Schedule

Players
Clemson states these were the starting players.

Line

Backfield

References

Clemson
Clemson Tigers football seasons
Clemson Tigers football